The 2004 Asian Judo Championships were held at the Baluan Sholak Palace of Culture and Sports in Almaty, Kazakhstan from 15 May to 16 May 2004. A total of 194 judokas participated, 113 men and 81 women.

Medal summary

Men

Women

Medal table

External links
 
 Results of the 2004 Asian Judo Championships  (All-Japan Judo Federation)
 About the 2004 Asian Judo Championships (Judo Union of Asia)

Asian Championships
Asian Judo Championships
Asian Judo Championships
International sports competitions hosted by Kazakhstan
Sports competitions in Almaty
Asian 2004
May 2004 sports events in Asia